Movie Plus is a Hindi-language 24x7 movie channel that was owned by Swami Films Entertainment Pvt Ltd.

References

External links 
 Official facebook page of Movie Plus

2019 establishments in Maharashtra
Television channels and stations established in 2019
Television networks in India
Television stations in Mumbai
Movie channels in India
Hindi-language television channels in India